Jade Eagleson is the self-titled, debut studio album by Canadian country music artist Jade Eagleson. It was released on July 24, 2020 through Universal Music Canada. The album includes the #1 Canada Country hit "Lucky", the Platinum-certified hit "Got Your Name on It", as well as "Count the Ways", and "Close". It was the most globally-streamed debut album for a Canadian country artist of all-time.

Background
Due to the COVID-19 pandemic, most artists were unable to release an album and support it with a tour. Despite this, Eagleson decided to release his debut album regardless, saying that the fans were "already losing out on so much with live shows not being around… It’s kind of a gift to [them]". Eagleson remarked that he felt "lucky" to have been able to record songs co-written by Chris Stapleton and Brad Rempel of High Valley on this album, while he co-wrote the other 8 tracks himself.

Critical reception
Joshua Murray and Trish Cassling of The Reviews Are In referred to the album as a "good country music listen" adding that listeners can "celebrate [it] as part of the next wave of talent coming from north of the border". Kim Hughes of Parton and Pearl stated that the album "cements [Eagleson's] status" as the "heir apparent" in "authentic country music".

Track listing

Charts

Singles

Awards and nominations

Release history

References

2020 debut albums
Jade Eagleson albums
Universal Music Canada albums
Albums produced by Todd Clark